Le Bocasse is a commune in the Seine-Maritime department in the Normandy region in northern France.

Geography

Population

Places of interest
 The church of Notre-Dame, dating from the sixteenth century.
 The château de Cleres, dating from the seventeenth century.
 The sixteenth century manor house at Valmartin.
 The church of St. Georges, Valmartin, dating from the twelfth century.
 A museum of agricultural machinery.
 Cleres zoo park.
 Parc du Bocasse, an Amusement park

See also
Communes of the Seine-Maritime department

References

External links

A website about Bocasse 

Communes of Seine-Maritime